This is a list of butterflies of Hong Kong. About 250 species are known from Hong Kong. One subspecies is endemic to the region.

Hesperiidae

Coeliadinae 
 Bibasis gomata lalita
 Bibasis oedipodea belesis
 Bibasis jaina
 Hasora badra badra
 Hasora vitta indica
 Hasora chromus chromus
 Hasora taminatus malayana
 Hasora anura china
 Badamia exclamationis
 Choaspes benjaminii japonicus
 Choaspes hemixanthus furcatus

Pyrginae 
 Celaenorrhinus leucocera
 Gerosis phisara
 Tagiades litigiosus litigiosus
 Tagiades menaka
 Abraximorpha davidii esta
 Odontoptilum angulatum angulatum
 Caprona alida alida

Hesperiinae 
 Ampittia dioscorides etura
 Ampittia virgata
 Aeromachus jhora
 Aeromachus pygmaeus
 Thoressa monastyrskyi
 Halpe porus
 Halpe paupera walthewi
 Astictopterus jama chinensis
 Iambrix salsala salsala
 Notocrypta curvifascia curvifascia
 Notocrypta paralysos
 Udaspes folus
 Suastus gremius gremius
 Isoteinon lamprospilus lamprospilus
 Hyarotis adrastus praba
 Erionota torus
 Matapa aria
 Taractrocera ceramas thelma
 Taractrocera maevius maevius
 Potanthus trachala trachala
 Potanthus pseudomaesa clio
 Potanthus pava pava
 Potanthus confucius confucius
 Telicota colon stinga
 Telicota besta besta
 Telicota ancilla horisha
 Telicota ohara formosana
 Cephrenes acalle
 Parnara guttata
 Parnara ganga
 Parnara bada bada
 Parnara apostata
 Zographetus satwa
 Borbo cinnara
 Borbo bevani
 Pelopidas agna agna
 Pelopidas mathias oberthueri
 Pelopidas subochraceus barneyi
 Pelopidas assamensis
 Pelopidas conjunctus conjunctus
 Polytremis lubricans lubricans
 Baoris farri farri
 Caltoris bromus bromus
 Caltoris cahira

Papilionidae

Papilioninae 
 Lamproptera curius walkeri
 Graphium sarpedon sarpedon
 Graphium cloanthus clymenus
 Graphium doson axion
 Graphium agamemnon agamemnon
 Pathysa antiphates antiphates
 Papilio (Chilasa) agestor
 Papilio (Chilasa) clytia
 Papilio xuthus xuthus
 Papilio machaon
 Papilio demoleus demoleus
 Papilio helenus helenus
 Papilio polytes polytes
 Papilio memnon agenor
 Papilio protenor protenor
 Papilio bianor bianor
 Papilio dialis
 Papilio paris paris
 Troides helena spilotia
 Troides aeacus aeacus
 Pachliopta aristolochiae goniopeltis
 Byasa alcinous manonensis

Pieridae

Pierinae 
 Delias hyparete hierte
 Delias pasithoe pasithoe
 Delias acalis acalis
 Delias belladonna kwangtungensis
 Leptosia nina nina
 Prioneris thestylis formosana
 Prioneris philonome clemanthe
 Pieris canidia canidia
 Pieris rapae crucivora
 Cepora nerissa nerissa
 Appias albina darada
 Appias lyncida eleonora
 Ixias pyrene pyrene
 Hebomoia glaucippe glaucippe

Coliadinae 
 Dercas verhuelli verhuelli
 Colias erate
 Catopsilia pyranthe pyranthe
 Catopsilia pomona pomona
 Eurema brigitta rubella
 Eurema laeta betheseba
 Eurema hecabe hecabe
 Eurema blanda hylama

Lycaenidae

Miletinae 
 Allotinus drumila aphthonius
 Miletus chinensis chinensis
 Taraka hamada isona

Curetinae  
 Curetis dentata denta

Aphnaeinae 
 Cigaritis lohita formosana
 Cigaritis syama peguana

Theclinae 
 Arhopala bazalus turbata
 Arhopala pseudocentaurus pirithous
 Arhopala birmana birmana
 Arhopala paramuta paramuta
 Arhopala rama ramosa
 Mahathala ameria hainani
 Horaga albimacula triumphalis
 Horaga onyx moltrechti
 Iraota timoleon timolecon
 Pratapa deva devula
 Tajuria cippus malcolmi
 Tajuria maculata
 Eliotia jalindra
 Creon cleobis cleobis
 Remelana jangala mudra
 Ancema ctesia agalla
 Deudorix epijarbas menesicles
 Artipe eryx eryx
 Sinthusa chandrana grotei
 Sinthusa nasaka
 Rapala manea schistacea

Lycaeninae
 Heliophorus epicles phoenicoparyphus

Polyommatinae 
 Nacaduba berenice
 Nacaduba kurava euplea
 Jamides bochus bochus
 Jamides celeno celeno
 Jamides alecto alocina
 Catochrysops strabo strabo
 Catochrysops panormus exiguus
 Lampides boeticus
 Leptotes plinius
 Castalius rosimon
 Pseudozizeeria maha serica
 Zizeeria karsandra karsandra
 Zizina otis otis
 Zizula hylax
 Famegana alsulus eggletoni
 Everes argiades
 Everes lacturnus rileyi
 Tongeia filicaudis
 Pithecops corvus
 Neopithecops zalmora zalmora; N. z. dolona
 Megisba malaya sikkima; M. m. volubilis
 Acytolepis puspa gisca
 Udara dilecta dilecta
 Udara albocaerulea albocaerulea
 Celastrina lavendularis limbata
 Euchrysops cnejus cnejus
 Chilades lajus leucofasciatus
 Luthrodes pandava pandava
 Freyeria putli

Riodinidae

Nemeobiidae 
 Zemeros flegyas flegyas
 Dodona egeon egeon
 Abisara echerius echerius

Nymphalidae

Satyrinae 
 Melanitis leda leda
 Melanitis phedima muskata
 Lethe chandica
 Lethe confusa confusa
 Lethe europa beroe
 Lethe rohria permagnis
 Lethe verma stenopa
 Neope muirheadii muirheadii
 Elymnias hypermnestra hainana
 Mycalesis mineus mineus
 Mycalesis zonata
 Ypthima baldus baldus
 Ypthima lisandra lisandra
 Ypthima norma norma
 Ypthima imitans
 Ypthima praenubila praenubila

Morphinae 
 Faunis eumeus eumeus
 Discophora sondaica tulliana

Charaxinae 
 Polyura athamas athamas
 Polyura nepenthes nepenthes
 Charaxes bernardus bernardus
 Charaxes bernardus bernardus

Biblidinae 
 Ariadne ariadne alterna

Heliconiinae 
 Cupha erymanthis erymanthis
 Phalanta phalantha phalantha
 Vagrans egista brixia
 Cirrochroa tyche mithila
 Argynnis hyperbius hyperbius
 Cethosia biblis phanaroia
 Acraea issoria issoria

Nymphalinae 
 Vanessa indica indica
 Vanessa cardui
 Kaniska canace canace
 Polygonia c-aureum c-aureum
 Symbrenthia lilaea lunica
 Junonia almana almana
 Junonia atlites atlites
 Junonia lemonias lemonias
 Junonia iphita iphita
 Junonia hierta hierta
 Junonia orithya orithya
 Hypolimnas anomala anomala
 Hypolimnas bolina kezia
 Hypolimnas misippus
 Kallima inachus chinensis

Limenitidinae 
 Neptis hylas hylas
 Neptis clinia susruta
 Neptis soma tayalina
 Neptis miah nolana
 Phaedyma columella columella
 Pantoporia hordonia
 Athyma perius perius
 Athyma nefte seitzi
 Athyma cama
 Athyma selenophora leucophryne
 Athyma ranga serica
 Parathyma sulpitia
 Parasarpa dudu hainanensis
 Moduza procris procris
 Euthalia lubentina lubentina
 Euthalia phemius seitzi
 Euthalia aconthea aditha
 Euthalia niepelti
 Lexias pardalis

Cyrestinae 
 Dichorragia nesimachus formosanus
 Cyrestis thyodamas chinensis

Apaturinae 
 Rohana parisatis staurakius
 Hestina assimilis assimilis
 Sephisa chandra androdamas
 Euripus nyctelius

Danainae 
 Parantica aglea melanoides
 Parantica sita sita
 Parantica swinhoei szechuana
 Ideopsis similis similis
 Tirumala limniace limniace
 Tirumala septentrionis septentronis
 Danaus chrysippus chrysippus
 Danaus genutia genutia
 Idea leuconoe
 Euploea midamus midamus
 Euploea sylvester swinhoei
 Euploea mulciber mulciber
 Euploea core amymone

References 
 
 
 
 

Hong Kong
H
Hong Kong